Nancy Zimmelman Lenoil was the State Archivist of California from 2006-2019.

Synopsis 

Nancy Ann Zimmelman was born in Detroit, Michigan, the daughter of William and Phyllis (Bargebuhr) Zimmelman. Her father was an engineer and instructor in his 42 year career for Ford Motor Company.  She earned a bachelor's degree in history from Oakland University and a master's degree in history, with graduate certificate in archival administration, from Wayne State University. She moved to the Sacramento, California region in 1987 for a ten month fellowship in archival administration, which turned into a 31 year career at the California State Archives. She married Robert Lenoil in 2007, and had boy/girl twins in 2010. Nancy and Robert are active in the Sacramento Jewish community; she served ten years on the board of trustees for the Jewish Federation of the Sacramento Region and currently serves on the board of trustees of Temple Or Rishon.

Career 

Lenoil began her work at the California State Archives in 1987. From 1992-2007 she served as the Administrator of the Western Archives Institute, an intensive, two-week instructional program sponsored by the State Archives. From 1994-2006, her duties included being in charge of the Archive's records of the Assassination of Robert F. Kennedy. She started teaching a class for the California Highway Patrol's Protection of Public Officials program in 1997, using the actual records and artifacts in the collection. She received a commendation from the CHP for her work, and continues to teach the class to this day.

In 2006 California Secretary of State Bruce McPherson appointed Lenoil as California's State Archivist, the first woman to hold that position. During her tenure the State Archives launched several initiatives, including a partnership with the Google Cultural Institute. Three collections were made available online, which Lenoil said was one step in the process of making records more accessible to the public. Lenoil spearheaded the effort to transfer responsibility for the management of state records from the Department of General Services to the State Archives, which passed as part of the fiscal year 2014 budget.

Lenoil has been active in professional organizations throughout her career - serving on and chairing committees, presenting at conferences, and publishing articles. Past and present memberships include the Society of American Archivists, Society of California Archivists, Academy of Certified Archivists, Council of State Archivists, and the National Association of Government Archives and Records Administrators. Her contributions to the profession led to her being named a Distinguished Fellow of the Society of American Archivists in 2012, the highest honor in the profession.

While the State Archivist serves at the pleasure of the Secretary of State, Lenoil retained the position under Secretaries of State McPherson, Debra Bowen and Alex Padilla, until her retirement in May of 2019.

Publications

Videos

References

Female archivists
Oakland University alumni
Wayne State University alumni
Fellows of the Society of American Archivists
Living people
Year of birth missing (living people)
People from Detroit